Jorge Noceda Sánchez (6 September 1925 – 11 March 1987) was a diplomat and painter from the Dominican Republic whose work has been collected by museums throughout the world.

Early life, education and career
Sánchez received a medical degree from the University of Santo Domingo in 1952. After graduation, he moved to New York City to specialize in gastroenterology at New York University while working as a resident in the Bronx.

However, he quickly became absorbed with painting, his new-found hobby. Initially self-taught, his talent developed rapidly. In 1956, Sánchez enrolled at the National Academy of Fine Arts in New York City, where he received instruction from French and American artists, including Robert Philip and René Bouché. His technique, magnificent color sense and whimsical style received immediate critical acclaim at exhibitions in New York, Havana and Santo Domingo, and later in Paris, Washington, D.C. and Mexico City.

By 1959, Sánchez decided to leave medicine and focus on his artwork. That year, he embarked on a world tour which brought him international recognition. During the tour, he exhibited in Tokyo, Hong Kong, New Delhi, Tel Aviv, Athens, Rome and at the Royal Academy in London. In 1960, he won a Gold Medal Award at the Biennial in São Paulo, Brazil.

In 1964, the Dominican Republic appointed Sánchez cultural attaché at the Dominican Republic Embassy in Tokyo.

In 1966, he was the first Dominican painter to exhibit at the Association Fraternal Latinoamericano. He later exhibited at Galleria 88 in Rome, the Federal Reserve in Washington, D.C. and galleries in New York City, including the Caravan Gallery, Hammer Gallery and, in 1975, at the Bodley Gallery, which featured the leading surrealist artists including Max Ernst, Yves Tanguy and René Magritte.

In 1966, Sánchez moved to Miami, where he also became a breeder of champion Shih Tzu and Japanese Chin dogs with his long-time partner, Gilbert Stanley Kahn, the son of the philanthropist Janet Annenberg Hooker and nephew of the publisher and diplomat Walter Annenberg.

Death
Sánchez died in Miami of colon and lung cancer, age 61. He was survived by Kahn and a sister.

Museum collections

 Musée national d'Art moderne, Paris, France
 National Museum of Modern Art, Tokyo, Japan
 Museo de Arte Contemporáneo, Madrid, Spain
 Palacio de Bellas Artes, Mexico City, Mexico
 Museo Nacional de Bellas Artes de La Habana (Palacio de Bellas Artes), Havana, Cuba
 Ethnological Museum of Berlin, Berlin, Germany

See also

 List of Dominican painters
 List of New York University alumni
 List of people from Miami

References

1925 births
1987 deaths
People from Santo Domingo
20th-century diplomats
Artists from New York City
Deaths from cancer in Florida
Dominican Republic diplomats
Dominican Republic expatriates in the United States
Dominican Republic expatriates in Japan
Dominican Republic painters
New York University alumni